The akuma (悪魔) is a malevolent fire spirit in Japanese folklore. It is also described as a category of undefined beings who brought afflictions on humans.

Alternative names for the akuma is ma (ま).  It is often translated to devil in English, or demon (see oni). Akuma is the name assigned to Satan in Japanese Christianity, and the Mara in Japanese Buddhism.

Mythology
Akuma first appeared in Buddhist texts although it became more popular during the Heian period from 794 to 1186 AD. Later, mainstream usage associated the name with the Christian Satan. It is said that, due to the lack of monotheism, there was no opponent of God so akuma became the equivalent of Satan. 

An akuma is typically depicted as an entity with a fiery head and eyes, and carrying a sword.  The akuma is typically said to be able to fly, and to be a harbinger of ominous and terrible fortune and can bring misfortune to those who happen to see it. 

Traditionally, the Japanese describe mental illness as a direct result of the presence of evil spirits, particularly by akuma.

In popular culture
 Akuma is featured in the Japanese novels such as Kazai Zenzo's Akuma (1912); Akutagawa Ryunosuke's The Devil's Tobacco (1916); and, Tamura Taijiro's The Demon of the Flesh (1946). 
The Japanese translation of Diana Wynne Jones' Howl's Moving Castle was translated into Japanese in 1997 as Mahotsukai Hauru to hi no akuma (The wizard Howl and the fire demon).
In the fighting game series Street Fighter, Akuma is the American name of a character named Gouki.
 In the television series Miraculous, an akuma is a small creature resembling a black butterfly with translucent purple highlights that can grant superpowers to any civilian through negative emotions. No matter their initial intentions, the one granted these powers inevitably goes on a destructive rampage in pursuing whoever caused that emotion turning them into supervillains, Scarlet Akumas are crimson with bright red edges and white markings, and Megakuma looks the same as a regular Akuma but slightly bigger and it’s powerful enough to  breaking through and destroy the magical charms created by Ladybug, which are used to prevent reakumatizing to anyone who were victims.
 In the manga D.Gray-man Akuma are machines created from the souls of deceased humans and are contained within the body of someone who grieves for them.
 Karateka based from Atari/Nintendo family system video game, the final boss is called Warlord Akuma who kidnapped Mariko.
 In the Compilation of Final Fantasy VII, the character Sephiroth displays many of the same traits and is known as the Akuma of Wutai, which is often translated as 'Devil', 'Demon', or 'Nightmare' in the English versions.
 In the animated series The Hollow, Akuma is the name of the leader of a group of demon monks.

References

 Unexplained mysteries.com, accessed 6 July 2016

Asian demons
Buddhist folklore
Demons in Buddhism
Japanese folklore
Japanese legendary creatures
Satan